Sara Ghislandi (born 23 November 1998) is an Italian ice dancer. With partner Giona Terzo Ortenzi, she has competed at two World Junior Championships, qualifying for the free dance in 2016.

Personal life 
Ghislandi was born on 23 November 1998 in Bergamo, Italy. She attended Liceo Scientifico Mascheroni before transferring to Centro Scolastico Bergamo, where she is a distance education student.

Career 
Ghislandi began learning to skate in 2005. She switched to ice dancing after two years in singles. She and Lorenzo Giossi skated together for four years, coached by Brunhilde Bianchi and Valter Rizzo in Zanica. They won the Italian novice title in the 2011–12 season.

Partnership with Ortenzi 
In 2012, Ghislandi teamed up with Giona Terzo Ortenzi after he asked to skate with her. Making their ISU Junior Grand Prix (JGP) debut, they placed 7th in Riga, in August 2013, and 11th in Košice the following month. Ortenzi then missed two months of training due to an ankle injury. Ranked 26th in the short dance, they did not reach the final segment at the 2014 World Junior Championships in Sofia, Bulgaria. The duo was coached by Brunhilde Bianchi and Valter Rizzo in Zanica. After the closure of Zanica's skating rink, the skaters moved to Sesto San Giovanni.

In the 2014–15 season, Ghislandi/Ortenzi listed Barbara Fusar-Poli and Stefano Caruso as their coaches. They placed sixth at their JGP event in Ljubljana and won their first national junior title. They were assigned to the 2015 World Junior Championships in Tallinn, Estonia, but withdrew a couple of weeks before the start of the event.

At the 2016 World Junior Championships in Debrecen, Hungary, Ghislandi/Ortenzi ranked 12th in the first segment and qualified for the free dance, going on to finish tenth overall.

Programs 
(with Ortenzi)

Competitive highlights 
JGP: Junior Grand Prix

With Ortenzi

With Giossi

References

External links 
 
 

1998 births
Italian female ice dancers
Living people
Sportspeople from Bergamo
20th-century Italian women
21st-century Italian women